Taxiwaala is a 2018 Indian Telugu-language supernatural comedy thriller film directed by Rahul Sankrityan, and produced by UV Creations and GA2 Pictures. The film stars Vijay Deverakonda, Priyanka Jawalkar, and Malavika Nair while Madhunandan, Ravi Varma, and Shiju play supporting roles with music composed by Jakes Bejoy. The car used was a modified Hindustan Contessa.

The film released on 17 November 2018 to positive reviews and became a box office success.

Plot 
The movie opens in a hospital. A woman, her husband, and brother-in-law are devastated after she gives birth to a stillborn baby boy while another young woman mourns the death of her mother. It then cuts to a year later. A taxi driver plans to get rid of his car. One rainy night, his wife witnesses a supernatural presence in it.

Shiva (the brother-in-law from the prologue) comes to Hyderabad to live with his friend Babai and find a job. After going through several jobs, he is not satisfied and decides to become a taxi driver. He goes to his village to get money from his brother, but instead gets it from his sister-in-law, who readily gives away her Mangalsutra (wedding chain) to him. A grateful Shiva agrees to help pay the costs for his sister-in-law to get admitted into a better hospital for the birth of her second child. Shiva and his friends, Babai and Hollywood, search for a car in their budget but fail. One morning, Shiva gets a call from an unknown person who is prepared to sell him a car. Shiva happily accepts while Babai is a little hesitant.

Shiva starts to work for the Ola Cab Service. On his first ride, he falls in love with a medical resident named Anusha after safely giving her a ride from a night out. Overtime, he starts to experience paranormal incidents in the car, notably a drunk passenger being scared out. He tries to contact the car's previous owner but learns he has moved away. A fake fakir comes and fools Shiva, Babai, and Hollywood to steal the car, but is almost killed inside it. The next morning, Shiva and his friends see the car in their garage. Shiva has to arrange money for his sister-in-law's upcoming delivery, so he decides to drive the car again. After being saved from an accident by the car itself, Shiva comes to befriend it. One night after dropping Anusha at her residence, Shiva is asked by a doctor to drop him somewhere. Suddenly, the car takes control and ultimately kills the doctor by throwing him onto some train tracks to be run over, much to Shiva's horror.

Shiva decides to rob the previous car owner's house to get his money back. He, Babai, and Hollywood break into the house and find a man imprisoned in the store room. They admit the man into a hospital, where Anusha treats him. After waking up, he reveals the truth about the car.

The man is a psychology and parapsychology professor. Among his subjects is Astral projection, through which a person can separate their soul from their body before death and can also meet the dead. One of his students, Sisira Bharadwaj (the young woman from the prologue), lived with her wealthy, asthmatic mother and step-father, Raghuram. The night of her birthday, she had a fight with her mother when Raghuram tried to replace Sisira's old car, which was a gift from her late father. Later that night, Sisira's mother suddenly began suffocating and couldn't find her inhaler. She knocked on her daughter's door, but was ignored. Sisira's mother died when she found her, leaving her daughter in grief and depression.

Sisira begged her professor to perform an Astral Projection ritual on her so she could see her mother one last time. The process was successful and Sisira's spirit ventured into the Astral world. She realised that her mother was actually murdered by Raghuram so he could usurp her company and the doctor, Raghuram's friend, poisoned her mother and stole her inhaler. Just then, Raghuram arrived and interrupted the ritual. He and the doctor decided to stage Sisira's death as a suicide and captured the professor to kill him later. The two were transported in Sisira's old car, which her soul bonded to after being separated from her body. Sisira's will had her body donated to science and was kept in a hospital.

In the present, the professor reveals Sisira can be brought back to life if they retrieve her body. Moved by her story, Shiva agrees to help. He and his friends break into the hospital and manage to steal Sisira's body, with the help of the security guard turned fakir who had tried to steal their car earlier. However, Raghuram plans to destroy Sisira's body and comes to the hospital. He is almost killed by her spirit, but barely saves himself. Shiva beats Raghuram and takes him and Sisira's body to the professor's lab where the car is. Raghuram wakes up and tries to kill Shiva but the car stops him and he's burned to death. Unfortunately, Sisira's body is also destroyed in the fire despite Shiva's efforts.

Later, Shiva learns from Anusha that his sister-in-law gave birth to a girl who was also stillborn due to a chromosome abnormality. At the hospital, Anusha sadly reveals that his sister-in-law will never be able to have a child. Everyone goes to the garage and consoles each other. In the car, Sisira's soul enters the baby girl's body and starts crying, giving both herself and the couple a second chance. Shiva, his family, his friends, the professor and Anusha come together and cuddle the baby.

Cast 

Vijay Devarakonda as Shiva
Priyanka Jawalkar as Anusha alias Anu
Malavika Nair as Sisira Bharadwaj
Madhunandan as Babai/Shiva's friend
Vishnu as Hollywood
Ravi Varma as Sisira's Professor
Shiju as Raghuram (Sisira's step-father)
Ravi Prakash as Shiva's brother
Kalyani as Shiva's sister-in-law
Yamuna as Sisira's mother
Uttej as Doctor
Kireeti Damaraju as a Doctor
Chammak Chandra as Fake Fakir / Hospital security guard
Chitram Seenu
Satya Krishnan as Doctor

Music

The song "Maate Vinadhuga" was the first to be released.

Reception 

123telugu.com in its review noted that "The audio of Taxiwala is not the regular song and dance album which will impress the moment you hear it. This is a situational album which will grow on you once you watch the thriller and connect with the story", and said it was "Youthful and Contemporary". Telugu360 said "Taxi Waala is an outright classy album and Jakes Bejoy strikes a very emotional chord as well." IndiaGlitz in its review noted "Taxiwala is a winsome album boasting of two melodious songs and two cinematic numbers. If the singers and the lyricist give their vocal/poetic best, the music director blends the known and the new well."

Release
It was simultaneously dubbed and released in Tamil as Sadugudu Vandi and in Hindi as Super Taxi.

Piracy 
The movie was initially set to release in May but it was postponed. In June, months before release of the movie, an uncut version of the movie was put up on the internet. On 7 November 2018, 10 days prior to the release of the film, a 45-minute clip of the film was leaked by the piracy website Tamil Rockers. The full movie was leaked a week later. Police immediately swung into action and the culprits were arrested.

References

External links 
 

2018 films
2018 horror films
Astral projection in popular culture
Indian comedy horror films
Films about automobiles
2010s Telugu-language films
Films scored by Jakes Bejoy
Indian fantasy comedy films
Indian supernatural thriller films
UV Creations films